John Chamberlain may refer to:

Politicians
John Chamberlain (14th-century MP) for Arundel (UK Parliament constituency)
John Chamberlain (died 1617), MP for Clitheroe (UK Parliament constituency)
John Curtis Chamberlain (1772–1834), US politician

Others
John Chamberlain (sculptor) (1927–2011), American sculptor
John Chamberlain (journalist) (1903–1995), American journalist and editor
John Chamberlain (letter writer) (1553–1628), English letter writer
John Chamberlain (missionary) (1777—1821), English missionary and bible translator
John Henry Chamberlain (1831–1883), English architect
John Loomis Chamberlain (1858–1948), American army officer, recipient of the Distinguished Service Medal
John M. Chamberlain (1844–1928), English composer

See also
Jack Chamberlain (disambiguation)
Chamberlain (surname)
John Chamberlaine (1745–1812), English antiquary and keeper
John Chamberlayne (1666–1723), English writer and translator
John Chamberlin (1837–1896), American chef and restaurateur